Orthaga achatina is a species of snout moth in the genus Orthaga. It was described by Arthur Gardiner Butler in 1878 and is known from Japan and Russia.

The larvae are a pest on Cinnamomum camphora.

References

External links
Calling and mating behaviors of adult Orthaga achatina (Lepidoptera: Pyralidae)

Moths described in 1878
Epipaschiinae
Moths of Japan